St. Clement Catholic Church was built in 1917–1918 in Lincoln Park in Chicago.  The architect was Thomas P. Barnett of the St. Louis firm of Barnett, Haynes & Barnett.

The church was built in a Byzantine style reminiscent of the church of Hagia Sophia in Istanbul. The decoration of the half-dome behind the high altar is a copy of the twelfth- or thirteenth-century mosaic in the apse of the Basilica of San Clemente al Laterano in Rome. The ground to begin building the church was broken on March 19, 1917.

St. Clement School
The church is also affiliated with a school, for which ground was broken on October 18, 1905. The school used to be both a church and a school before the current church was built. Saint Clement School serves children in Pre-kindergarten through 8th grade with a total of over 460 students.

Notable alumni 

 John Mulaney, actor, comedian
 Billy Dec – Rockit Ranch Productions CEO and founder, actor

Gallery

References

External links
 
Saint Clement Church (Official Site)

Clement Church
Roman Catholic churches completed in 1918
Byzantine Revival architecture in Illinois
20th-century Roman Catholic church buildings in the United States